Flockers is a Lemmings-type strategy game made by Team17. The  game was released worldwide on September 19, 2014.

Reception

Flockers received "mixed or average" reviews according to Metacritic, scoring 66/100 for the PC version based on 11 reviews, 61/100 for the PlayStation 4 version based on 15 reviews, and 65/100 for the Xbox One version based on 10 reviews.

References

External links 
 

Team17 games
2014 video games
Android (operating system) games
IOS games
Linux games
MacOS games
Multiplayer and single-player video games
PlayStation 4 games
Strategy video games
Video games developed in the United Kingdom
Windows games
Xbox One games